The women's 10 kilometre freestyle at the 1999 Asian Winter Games was held on February 5, 1999 at Yongpyong Cross Country Venue, South Korea.

Schedule
All times are Korea Standard Time (UTC+09:00)

Results

References

Results

External links
Results FIS

Women 10